The women's doubles was one of five events at the 1920 World Hard Court Championships. Suzanne Lenglen and Elizabeth Ryan were the title holders, but did not participate. Dorothy Holman and Phyllis Satterthwaite won the Championship, defeating Germaine Golding and Jeanne Vaussard 6–3, 6–1 in the final.

Draw

Draw

References

Women's Doubles